Phelps County Jail is a historic jail located on Park Street between Second and Third Streets, Rolla, Missouri, was built in 1860 for $3,000. The jail was operated by Phelps County from 1860 to 1912. Union forces, which took over the town in 1861, used the jail for both military and civilian prisoners during the American Civil War. The lower floor contains two windowless  stone cells for solitary confinement. The upper floor contains a single room with cages made from iron bars to hold multiple prisoners. The upper floor also includes a wood-burning stove used for heating. Dr. E.A. Stricker presented the jail to the Phelps County Historical Society in 1943.  

It was added to the National Register of Historic Places in 1990.

References

Rolla, Missouri
Jails on the National Register of Historic Places in Missouri
Government buildings completed in 1860
Tourist attractions in Phelps County, Missouri
Buildings and structures in Phelps County, Missouri
National Register of Historic Places in Phelps County, Missouri